Alfred Gresham Jones (1824–1915) was an Irish architect who moved to Australia after 1888.

Jones was born in 1824 in Dublin, and attended the Royal Dublin Society's School of Architectural Drawing in the 1840s and spent time in London and with Irish architect John Skipton Mulvany before beginning his own career.

His architect career in Ireland began in the 1850s, and by 1888 he had emigrated to Australia, but it is unclear if he continued his vocation.

Buildings designed by Jones
Most of Jones' work was in Dublin before 1888:
Strathmore (Killiney), Dublin 1860s
Dalkey Methodist Church, Dublin 1861
interior of Merrion Hall Dublin 1863 - now O’Callaghan-Davenport Hotel
Dublin Exhibition Crystal Palace 1863 - preparatory to the International Exhibition of Arts and Manufactures 
Bray Methodist Church, Bray, County Wicklow 1864
Sandymount Methodist Church, Dublin 1864
Athlone Methodist Church 1865
St. Paul's Church, Glenageary, County Dublin 1865
Earlsfort Terrace complex, Dublin 1865
Villa Carlotta, Monkstown 1870
Villa Verona, Monkstown 1873
Wesley College, Dublin 1879
Mytilene, 53 Ailesbury Road, Dublin 1883

Personal life
Jones married Julia Charlotte Malyn (died 1929) in 1855 and they had several children (Charlotte Dixon, Alice Johnson, Mary Watson, Alfred, Maude Allen and Walter).

Later years and death
Jones immigrated to Australia, but does not appear to have practised as an architect, as no major work is accounted to him during this time. He developed an interest in verse during this time and died in Melbourne in 1915.

References

Architects from Dublin (city)
Irish people of Welsh descent
People from Melbourne
1824 births
1915 deaths